Almost Here is the debut studio album by English rock band Unbelievable Truth. Available on Virgin Records, catalogue number CDVX2849. Also available on MiniDisc MDV2849 / 7243 8 45155 8 4.

Background
Vocalist and guitarist Andy Yorke and drummer Nigel Powell met while attending school, with the latter later meeting bassist Jason Moulster through mutual friends. Yorke had been studying Russian literature abroad in Russia; while here, he wrote several songs and subsequently asked Moulster to form a band on his behalf so they could work on the material when he returned. Unbelievable Truth formed in 1993. Yorke would take several more trips to Russia over the next few years, offering himself as a interpreter. Unbelievable Truth signed to Virgin Records in March 1997.

Composition and lyrics
Musically, the sound of Almost Here has been described as soft rock. AllMusic reviewer Stephen Thomas Erlewine referred to it as an "alluringly moody record, similar to the epic soundscapes" of Radiohead and the Verve, "only with a bit of a country-rock underpinning". PopMatters founder Sarah Zupko wrote that it "relies on largely acoustic arrangements and intricate dynamics", with influences from emo and Dog Man Star (1994) by Suede. Yorke said the music is typically written first with the lyrics coming last; Powell said he would take each individual's part and coalesce them together to form a complete song. "Higher Than Reason" evoked the sound of Jeff Buckley and Nick Drake.

Release
To promote the "Higher Than Reason" single, the band went on a UK tour in November 1997. In February 1998, they went on another UK tour. "Higher Than Reason" was released as a single in the US on 2 February 1998. Almost Here was released through Virgin Records on 11 May 1998. The band promoted it with a launch show at the Virgin Megastore in Oxford, prior to a UK tour for the rest of the month. Shortly afterwards, they appeared at T in the Park and Glastonbury Festival.

Reception

Erlewine said Yorke's lyricism can be viewed as "adolescent and the Unbelievable Truth's ambition often outweighs their accomplishments, but the promise they flaunt on their debut proves that they are almost there". Zupko added to this, saying that the band had "sculpted a set of compelling, introspective songs that form a cohesive artistic statement". The Independent writer Angela Lewis saw it as a "true beaut of a debut album [...] with 11 arresting songs that eschew everything the Cool Britannia party has to offer". Pitchfork writer Brent DiCrescenzo said they perform "sylvan, introspective soft-rock that's pretty and pleasant, but too mono-emotional (read: sad)". MTV's Kim Stitzel called it "restrained, mild, kinda pretty, and overwhelmingly inoffensive". Victoria Segal of NME went further by writing that it was "supernaturally dull, vaporised by its earnestness" and that that it was "useful only as road music for somnambulists, 'Almost Here' will knock you out. Cold."

Several reviews compared it to Radiohead; Segal wrote that the band had "enough of a resemblance to Radiohead - serious, sensitive, the usual - to make it unavoidable". DiCrescenzo was not surprised that the band "sounds like a watered-down Radiohead", though felt that Andy Yorke lacked the "intensity, tension, and questionable sanity" of Thom Yorke. Tim Mohr of Consumable Online dismissed this comparison, stating that the band "don't sound remotely similar to Radiohead", being more inline with Arnold and Crowded House. He goes on to say Andy Yorke's vocal "style is completely his own and shows no trace of Thom". CMJ New Music Monthly David Jarman wrote that the album "reveals a promising band that doesn't need to ride on anyone's coattails", though did admit that Yorke "shares some vocal tics with his brother – a lilting tenor, a fondness for quivering and hurt phrasing".

Track listing
"Solved" – 3:46
"Angel" – 3:51
"Stone" – 3:37
"Same Mistakes" – 3:01
"Forget About Me" – 3:57
"Settle Down" – 3:13
"Finest Little Space" – 3:40
"Building" – 5:04
"Almost Here" – 4:08
"Higher Than Reason" – 4:02
"Be Ready" – 2:51

References
Citations

Sources

External links

Almost Here at YouTube (streamed copy where licensed)

1998 debut albums
Unbelievable Truth albums
Virgin Records albums